Naumovo is a rural locality (a village) in Gorkinskoye Rural Settlement, Kirzhachsky District, Vladimir Oblast, Russia. The population was 19 as of 2010. There are 6 streets.

Geography 
Naumovo is located on the Sherna River, 11 km west of Kirzhach (the district's administrative centre) by road. Yeltsy is the nearest rural locality.

References 

Rural localities in Kirzhachsky District